Austrosaurus was an extinct genus of titanosaurian sauropod dinosaur from the Allaru Formation, from the early Cretaceous (112-105 million years ago) of Central-Western Queensland in Australia.

Discovery and species 

The holotype, QM F2361 (consisting of three blocks containing primitive and badly weathered vertebrae and rib fragments, with a further 5 large blocks and at least 10 smaller ones later assigned to the holotype as well), was discovered by Mr. H.B. Wade on Clutha Station near Maxwelton in north Queensland in 1932, who alerted the station manager H. Mackillop, who showed his brother who sent them to the Queensland Museum. Austrosaurus was described by Heber Longman in 1933.

Paleobiology 
Originally it was thought that sauropods spent time near or in water to relieve weight from their legs. However, this theory is now rejected and it is believed that Austrosaurus like all sauropods lived on dry land. Fossil finds suggest a height of approximately 3.9 metres at the hip and 4.1 metres at the shoulder, which would have given it an almost level back.

Classification 
Initially, Austrosaurus was considered a cetiosaurid, like Patagosaurus or Shunosaurus. Hocknull et al. (2009) described the new sauropod Wintonotitan from material that originally assigned to Austrosaurus by Coombs and Molnar in 1981.  Hocknull suggested that Austrosaurus mckillopi differed only slightly from the QMF 7292, the holotype of Wintonotitan wattsii, and should be considered a nomen dubium. Recently, Poropat et al. (2017) reported additional sauropod material from the Austrosaurus type locality and assigned them to the Austrosaurus holotype, finding the genus to be a valid titanosauriform tentatively assignable to Somphospondyli.

References

Further reading

External links 

 Australian Sauropods
 Australian Age of Dinosaurs Museum, Winton, Qld
 Dann'S Dinosaur Info: Austrosaurus

Titanosaurs
Early Cretaceous dinosaurs of Australia
Paleontology in Queensland
Fossil taxa described in 1933
Taxa named by Albert Heber Longman
Sauropods of Australia